Vladas Burba (born 10 September 1966) is a Lithuanian judoka. He competed in the men's half-heavyweight event at the 1992 Summer Olympics.

References

1966 births
Living people
Lithuanian male judoka
Olympic judoka of Lithuania
Judoka at the 1992 Summer Olympics
Place of birth missing (living people)
20th-century Lithuanian people